The Hotel Hershey is a resort hotel in Hershey, Pennsylvania. Established in 1933, it is a historical landmark and five-star hotel located on a hilltop overlooking Hershey, Pennsylvania, and the surrounding area. It was inducted into Historic Hotels of America, the official program of the National Trust for Historic Preservation, since 1991.

The hotel's architectural style is Spanish Colonial revival, including mosaic tiles and archways, and a villa-style balcony overlooking Hershey and Hershey Gardens. Historic photographs and original artwork line the halls and decorate guest room walls, as well as the Iberian Lounge, which is designed to resemble dim, fireplace-lit cigar lounges of the past.

History

During the Great Depression, Milton S. Hershey, founder of The Hershey Chocolate Company, planned for the hotel to be a recreation of the famous Heliopolis Palace Hotel, construction plans changed and were delayed due to costs, the death of Hershey's wife, Catherine, and the outbreak of World War I. When construction began, the new plans drew on Mediterranean and Spanish influences.

Construction began in 1931 and the hotel was completed on May 23, 1932. The effort employed as many as 800 workers. The bill for the hotel was around $2 million. The Hotel officially opened on May 26, 1933. Generating income by then was not the main goal of the project. Being the height of the Great Depression, Hershey was attempting to help the people of the city by creating jobs.

In 1934, a nine-hole golf course was added to the grounds and in 1961, an outdoor swimming pool was added. In 1977, a new 100 room wing was added to the hotel along with a new indoor pool and fitness center. In 2001, a full service spa called "The Spa At The Hotel Hershey" was added.  The spa offered treatments featuring chocolate, including: chocolate wraps, chocolate baths, chocolate lotion and scrubs. In 2009, The Hotel Hershey completed work on a $67 million expansion and renovation project which included a redesigned exterior and lobby.

References

External links
 
 Hershey Community Archives website
 Historic Hotel Hershey photographs

Buildings and structures in Dauphin County, Pennsylvania
Hershey Entertainment and Resorts Company
Hershey, Pennsylvania
Hotels in Pennsylvania
1933 establishments in Pennsylvania
Hotels established in 1933
Hotel buildings completed in 1933
Historic Hotels of America